The 1975 Uber Cup was the 7th edition of the Uber Cup, the women's badminton team competition. The tournament took place in the 1974-75 badminton season, 14 countries competed. Indonesia won its first title in the Uber Cup, after beating the defending champion Japan in the Final Round in Jakarta.

Teams
14 teams from 4 regions took part in the competition. As defending champions, Japan skipped the qualifications and played directly in the second round of the inter-zone ties (team matches), effectively the semifinals of the tournament.

Australasian zone
 (exempt from qualifying rounds)

Asian zone
 (exempt from qualifying rounds)

European zone

Pan-American zone

From the qualifying rounds, four countries progressed to the inter-zone ties. From the Australasian zone, Australia advanced to the next round after beating New Zealand 4–3. From the Asian zone, Malaysia beat India 6–1. In the European zone final, England defeated Denmark 5–2. From the Pan American zone, Canada advanced to the inter-zone ties after defeating the United States 5–2.

Inter-zone playoffs

First round

Second round

Final round
Japan played in its fourth consecutive Uber Cup final, having won the tournament in 1966, 1969, and 1972. The Japanese women won two of the three singles, but dropped all four doubles to the Indonesian women who were playing before their home crowd. Indonesia thus won the Uber Cup for the first time. It was the final Uber Cup appearance of two great "veterans", Japan's  Noriko Nakayama (née Takagi), who completed her fourth campaign undefeated in singles, and Indonesia's Minarni Soedaryanto who, after playing on Indonesian teams since 1959, finally achieved the ultimate prize.

Final round

References

External links
tangkis.tripod.com
Mike's Badminton Populorum

Uber Cup, 1975
Uber Cup
Thomas & Uber Cup